Artem Petrovych Kovbasa (born 19 January 1997) is a Ukrainian professional footballer who plays as an attacking midfielder.

Career
Kovbasa is a product of different Kievan youth football school systems (Arsenal, Dynamo). He played for FC Kyiv and Arsenal. At the age of 15 he moved to Dynamo, where he studied until 2014. He made his debut in the youth championship (U-19) on March 26, 2014 in a match against Dnipro (0:2), which became the only one for him that season. In the following season 2014/15 he played in 18 matches of the youth championship, in which he scored 4 goals.

In the summer of 2015, along with a number of other players, he was declared for Dynamo-2 in the First League. He made his adult debut on July 27, 2015 in the 1st round match against Ternopil (2:1), coming on as a substitute in the 75th minute instead of Ivan Trubochkin.

In July 2016 he became a player of the club "Obolon". In September 2020 he became a player of "Chornomorets" Odesa.

References

External links
 
 
 

1997 births
Living people
Footballers from Kyiv
Ukrainian footballers
Association football midfielders
FC Dynamo Kyiv players
FC Dynamo-2 Kyiv players
FC Obolon-Brovar Kyiv players
FC Obolon-2 Kyiv players
FC Chornomorets Odesa players
FC Olimpik Donetsk players
Ukrainian First League players